Jeff Fisher (born September 5, 1960) is an author, sports journalist and play-by-play announcer who co-founded High School Football America, a digital media sports company in 2004. On September 4, 2018, Skyhorse Publishing released Fisher's first book High School Football in Texas – Amazing Football Stories From the Greatest Players of Texas, which features one-on-one interviews with nearly fifty past and present National Football League players, including nine of whom are currently enshrined in the Pro Football Hall of Fame, talking about their favorite Texas high school football memories.

Career
A Wilson Area High School graduate, Fisher began his broadcasting career at the age of 14 working as a spotter and statistician at high school football game broadcasts on WEST-AM Radio in Easton, Pennsylvania. In 1993, he transitioned into television, working at WFMZ-TV in Allentown, Pennsylvania. He became the station's Sports Director  in 1997. During his time at the station, he created The Big Ticket, which in 2000 was named the Best Television Sportscast in Pennsylvania by the Associated Press. Fisher also served as the host of the Lehigh University Sports Forum television show and was the play-by-play voice of the Lehigh University men's basketball team from 1996 through 2000. He was also the station's play-by-play host for its broadcasts covering the Allentown Ambassadors, professional baseball team in the Northern League.

Fisher left WFMZ-TV  in 2000 to become and sports anchor/reporter at FOX Sports Net in Chicago, Illinois where he worked on the network's shows in Chicago, Ohio and San Francisco, California.

In 2004, Fisher launched High School Football America with fellow journalist Trish Hoffman in Chicago, Illinois. In 2012, Fisher moved High School Football America to Los Angeles to launch its highly-successful radio show High School Football America SoCal  on AM 570 FOX Sports Radio.

Book
For his book, High School Football in Texas – Amazing Football Stories From the Greatest Players of Texas, Fisher personally spoke with players about their favorite high school football memories. In addition to the players themselves, Fisher interviewed coaches, parents and fans about the players he featured.

Players featured are: 
 Chapter 1 - Raymond Berry
 Chapter 2 - Bill Bradley (American football)
 Chapter 3 - Drew Brees
 Chapter 4 - Earl Campbell
 Chapter 5 - Andy Dalton
 Chapter 6 - Eric Dickerson
 Chapter 7 - Derwin Gray
 Chapter 8 - Joe Greene
 Chapter 9 - Ken Houston
 Chapter 10 - Craig James (running back)
 Chapter 11 - Bob Lilly
 Chapter 12 - Andrew Luck
 Chapter 13 - Don Maynard
 Chapter 14 - Mike Singletary
 Chapter 15 - Lovie Smith
 Chapter 16 - LaDainian Tomlinson
 Chapter 17 - Elmo Wright

High School Football America

High School Football America, also known as HSFA, tells the story of America through the lens of high school football. HSFA is best known for its storytelling and national, regional and state rankings.

Since 2012, HSFA has been part of the High School Football National Championship conversation. The company began crowning national champs in 2012 with an opinion poll. In 2013, HSFA switched to naming its national champ using a proprietary algorithm created by Fisher.

References

1960 births
American writers
Living people